Sf9 may refer to:

 Sf9 (cells), a cell line
 SF9, a South Korean boy band